Shawan Ancient Town is an 800 hundred years old southern China town located in the Panyu District of the Guangzhou city, founded during the Song Dynasty. It's traditionally linked to the historical and folk Lingan culture.

The Town area covers 153 hectares and it's divided into an east village, west village, and north village. Guangdong dessert Jiang Zhuang Nai, a ginger-flavored milk curd, originated in Shawan.

References 

Tourist attractions in Guangzhou
Buildings and structures in Guangzhou
Towns in China